John Carroll University is a private Jesuit university in University Heights, Ohio. It is primarily an undergraduate, liberal arts institution accompanied by the John M. and Mary Jo Boler College of Business. John Carroll has an enrollment of 3,650 students. The university offers undergraduate programs in the liberal arts, sciences, and business, and in selected areas at the master's level. John Carroll offers 70 academic programs of study for undergraduate students.

History

Founding
John Carroll University was founded in 1886 by the Society of Jesus under the title of St Ignatius College, after St. Ignatius of Loyola, as a "college for men". It has been in continuous operation as a degree-granting institution since that time. Founded as the 19th of 28 Jesuit colleges and universities in the United States, it is a member of the Association of Jesuit Colleges and Universities. It was founded 97 years after Georgetown University, the first Catholic Jesuit University in the United States.

In 1923 the college was renamed John Carroll University, honoring the first archbishop of the US Catholic Church, who founded Georgetown University. However, the high school section retained the original name and continues to operate on the original site in Cleveland. The city of University Heights had been renamed from "Idlewood" during the construction of the campus.

During World War II, John Carroll was one of 131 colleges and universities nationally that took part in the V-12 Navy College Training Program which offered students a path to a Navy commission.

Expansion
In September 1968, the university made the transition from full-time male enrollment to a fully coeducational institution, admitting women to the College of Arts and Sciences for the first time.

In recent years, the university has undergone extensive reconstruction and expansion. In 2003, the university opened the $66 million,  Dolan Center for Science and Technology, named after alumnus Charles Dolan, founder of Cablevision and HBO, and his wife Helen Dolan.  The couple met while attending John Carroll. In 2011, the university completed the removal of the Bohannon Science building and celebrated the Hamlin Quad enhancement project.

Jesuit tradition
The Jesuits who founded St. Ignatius College were exiles from Germany, forced out by Bismarck's Kulturkampf. They brought with them the traditional structure of the Jesuit college as an extension of the apostolate of the religious community to prepare the student morally as well as intellectually. The principal instrument of this education was the classical course of seven years, in which the first three years were devoted to learning languages as necessary tools. The student was then considered prepared for university work. The next four years were devoted to the study of classical literature and Latin and Greek prose and poetry, and to developing the ability to express one's self in these languages, as well as in the vernacular, orally and in writing. The final year was devoted to philosophy. There were also electives in the sciences, history, and geography, as well as other subjects. If the student completed only six years, a certificate was given. Completion of the year of philosophy made the student eligible for the baccalaureate degree, which the college was empowered to grant when it was chartered in 1890. The first two degrees were awarded in 1895.

John Carroll's core value and mission emphasizes social justice and service to the community and the broader world. The university also follows Jesuit traditions by focusing on educating the “whole” student, or the intellectual, spiritual, emotional, and physical development of each student. Although its curriculum and community are shaped by its Jesuit and Catholic nature, it welcomes faculty, staff, and students of all faiths and of no faith.

The university announced in December, 2017 that its board of directors had named the school's first non-Jesuit president, Michael D. Johnson, PhD. Johnson had been the provost at Babson College in Wellesley, Massachusetts. He began his tenure on July 1, 2018, and was officially inaugurated on September 6, 2018.

Academics
John Carroll University is organized into two schools: the College of Arts and Sciences and the AACSB-accredited Boler College of Business, each defining its own academic programs under the auspices of the Academic Vice President. All students need to fulfill the requirements in the core curriculum, as well as those required by their major field of study.

Core curriculum
The university requires a liberal arts core for all undergraduate students. Among the requirements are public speaking, English composition, two philosophy courses, two religious studies courses, a social justice course, a global course, and a foreign language requirement.

College of Arts and Sciences
John Carroll University's College of Arts and Sciences offers its students 31 majors and 28 minors. Some of the most popular majors are integrated marketing communications, education, political science, biology, and psychology.

Boler College of Business
On May 15, 2018, The Boler Family Foundation made a challenge gift of $10 million, kicking off the Inspired Lives Campaign, which was bolstered by an additional $5 million in contributions. The university announced the formation of the John M. and Mary Jo Boler College of Business, which will include two new schools: the School of Accountancy and Information Science, and the School of Leadership and Social Innovation.

The John M. and Mary Jo Boler College of Business offers seven majors, as well as several minors. The undergraduate academic programs offered are Accountancy, Economics, Finance, Financial Planning and Wealth Management, Supply Chain Management, Management and Human Resources, Marketing, and International Business with Language and Culture.

Graduate programs
John Carroll University provides students the ability to continue their education in a graduate studies program. The Boler College of Business offers three graduate programs where students can earn a Master of Science in Accountancy, Full-Time Boler MBA, and Part-Time Boler MBA. In addition, the College of Arts of Sciences offers a variety of graduate programs of study. A partial list of these programs includes Biology, Clinical Mental Health Counseling, Early Childhood Generalist, Education, Educational Leadership, Educational Psychology, English, Humanities, Mathematics, Nonprofit Administration, School Counseling, School Psychology, and Theology and Religious Studies.

International programs
John Carroll has several international programs in which eligible students are able to participate. The university operates several of their own programs and cooperates with other Jesuit universities in operating other programs. John Carroll University's Exchange Programs include the International Student Exchange Program, and programs at Kansai Gaidai University, Nanzan University and Sophia University, all in Japan as well as the Dortmund University of Technology, Germany and University of Hull, England.

John Carroll University's sponsored programs are either administered by John Carroll University or by another Jesuit University. In certain cases, John Carroll University faculty accompany and remain abroad with the students the entire semester. These programs include the Belfast Institute in Peace Building and Conflict Transformation, the Boler School of Business Semester in London, Italian Studies at Vatican City, the London Liberal Arts Semester, the Jesuit Beijing Center, as well as Casa de la Solidaridad in El Salvador.

All international programs, including those for international students who study at John Carroll, are managed by the university's Center for Global Education.

Scholarships
The university has four merit scholarships including the Presidential Honors Award, the Presidential Leadership Award, the Arrupe Scholars Award, and the Magis Scholarship. Department scholarships are offered by individual departments and include the Castellano Scholarship, usually awarded yearly to one or two freshman applicants who will major in the classical languages (Latin and Greek). This award covers full tuition for four years.

Rankings and awards
Selected as the fourth best university in the Midwest in the 2018 U.S. News & World Report's ranking of all regional universities in their guide to "America's Best Colleges,". This was the 30th consecutive year that John Carroll had ranked in the top 10 on this list.
The John M. and Mary Jo Boler School of Business is ranked No. 1 in the nation in Bloomberg Businessweek’s 2016 “Best Undergraduate Business Schools” Employer Survey for the graduates best prepared for work in their fields. The Boler School is ranked #30 overall in the country.
Ranked No. 8 on as a “Best Value” school within its category in the 2018 U.S. News & World Report annual guide.
Ranked No. 3 on “Best Undergraduate Teaching" within its category in the 2016 U.S. News & World Report annual guide.
Chosen as one of Forbes Best Value Schools of 2016.
Selected as a Presidential Award Finalist for the President's Higher Education Community Service Honor Roll, the highest federal recognition a university can receive for its commitment to volunteering, service learning, and civic engagement. This year, John Carroll is one of only 14 colleges and universities nationwide to receive recognition as a finalist. This is the sixth consecutive year that the university has been named to the honor role.

Campus
More than twenty major buildings, predominantly Collegiate Gothic in architecture (not to be confused with the common Tudor Revival style found in much of Cleveland Heights), and sixty landscaped acres make up the John Carroll campus. The Administration Building, surmounted by the university's landmark Grasselli Tower, bears clear resemblance to the English royal palace Hampton Court.

In recent years, the university has purchased several homes as well as a nearby shopping plaza to enhance the student and community experience.

Other major facilities include:
    
Boler College of Business
D.J. Lombardo Student Center
Dolan Center for Science and Technology
Don Shula Stadium complex
Grasselli Library
O'Malley Center for Communications and Language Arts
  
Kulas Auditorium
Rodman Hall
Saint Francis Chapel
Tony DeCarlo Varsity Center
Eight student residence halls.

Student life

Student organizations
There are over 100 student-led organizations at John Carroll, many of which have the underlying goal of providing service to the community – be it the community of the local Cleveland area or the global community at large.

Greek life
John Carroll University's fraternities and sororities are approved by the John Carroll University Office of Student Activities and are governed by the rules of the Interfraternity and Panhellenic Councils, respectively.

The following four fraternities have chapters or colonies at John Carroll University:
Beta Theta Pi (ΒΘΠ)
Delta Tau Delta (ΔΤΔ)
Sigma Phi Epsilon (ΣΦΕ)

The following five sororities have chapters at John Carroll University:
Chi Omega (ΧΩ)
Gamma Phi Beta (ΓΦΒ)
Kappa Alpha Theta (ΚΑΘ)
Kappa Delta (ΚΔ)
Kappa Kappa Gamma (ΚΚΓ)

Center for Service & Social Action
The Center for Service & Social Action facilitates activities related to social justice as course components, and as voluntary one-time or semester-long experiences. The Center for Service and Social Action offers a variety of service opportunities for students looking to get involved and give back to the community. Many John Carroll University students take advantage of service opportunities during their undergraduate studies.

Center for Student Diversity & Inclusion
CSDI educates students on diversity, equity and inclusion. The center nurtures a sense of belonging for students from diverse backgrounds and encourages curricular and co-curricular learning. The center advises and cultivates the leadership of its students through cultural student organizations that include: Black Students in Action(BSA), Asian Pop Culture, Le Cercle Francais, LGBTQIA+ Allies, Hillel, Latin America Student Association (LASA), Middle Eastern Student Association (MESA), Minority Association of Pre-Medical Students (MAPS), Muslim Student Society (MSS), Italian Club, Club for the Inclusiveness of Students with Disabilities (CISD), South Asian Student Association (SASA), and Women in STEM.

Arrupe
Named for Pedro Arrupe, the Arrupe Scholars Program recognizes John Carroll students for their significant commitment to two interrelated values of John Carroll's mission: intellectual inquiry that demands critical thinking, and engaging in social justice and community service that leads to social action.

Housing
John Carroll is a primarily residential campus, with over 60% of all students living on campus in one of eight residence halls; 90% of freshmen and sophomores live on campus. In addition, the university owns various apartment buildings and townhouses nearby campus that become additional options for juniors and seniors in their final two years at the university.

Residence halls
There are eight residence halls on John Carroll's campus. During a student's first year, they are placed in one of the following four residence halls:
 Pacelli Hall, named after Eugenio Pacelli (Pope Pius XII), is a co-ed residence hall and has a capacity of 216.
 Sutowski Hall has a capacity of 171 students. Depending on the gender proportions of each freshman class, the hall assignments vary. For the 2011–2012 Academic Year, Sutowski Hall houses male and female residents.
Campion Hall is the newest residence hall. It was built in 1990 as "Gnu Hall" but was dedicated to St. Edmund Campion and the defunct Campion Jesuit High School in Prairie du Chien, Wisconsin on November 13, 1993. It houses first year students and has standard dormitory style rooms. Each of the residents of Campion Hall has access to a full kitchen and dining area.  Campion Hall is the largest freshman dorm on campus.
Dolan Hall was completed in 1955 and is dedicated to Thomas F. Dolan. From 1994 to 2006, Dolan Hall was an all female dormitory but in 2007 it was changed to a co-ed, "Super-Single" style dorm with 214 students living in individual rooms.

The other four residence halls house upperclassmen. All are coed but rooms are separated by gender in different wings of each hall.
Murphy Hall houses 408 students. Murphy Hall is co-ed, with both male and female residents sharing the same building although not the same wings of the building. Murphy Hall rooms are designed in a Suite-style layout. Residents of Murphy Hall shares a room with one other person, and share a common living area with the adjacent room.
Hamlin Hall was built in 1988 and is dedicated to Richard M. Hamlin, a John Carroll University alumnus. 294 students reside within its walls, in standard dormitory style rooms. Hamlin Hall is also furnished with a complete kitchen, available for use by any of its residents. Hamlin Hall is the only Greek life dorm on campus and is home to 5 sororities and 3 fraternities.
Millor Hall was finished in 1981. Given its location toward the south end of campus, this building was temporarily "South Hall" but was later changed as a dedication to Rev. William J. Millor in October of that year. 242 students reside in Millor Hall which is home to the Delta Tau Delta fraternity floor.
Bernet Hall was the first dormitory erected on campus in 1935. It was built at the recommendation of a major supporter of the university and its namesake, John J. Bernet, who called for a place to house those "boys from Greater Cleveland who will be forced to go home every night." It was remodeled from its original design and is now the home of 100 upperclassmen, each of whom has an apartment style dormitory with either 2, 4 or 6 students per apartment.  Residency in Bernet Hall is competitive and the only residence hall on John Carroll's campus requiring an application. John Joseph Bernet was president of the Nickel Plate Road, Erie Railroad, Chesapeake and Ohio Railway and Pere Marquette Railroad in the United States. He was known for bringing railroad companies back from bankruptcy to solvency, earning him the nickname "Doctor of Sick Railroads"

Athletics

John Carroll fields 23 varsity sports teams. The official colors are blue and gold, and teams compete under the nickname Blue Streaks. John Carroll teams compete in NCAA Division III. The university has been a member institution of the Ohio Athletic Conference since 1989.

The university plays football, lacrosse and soccer in Don Shula Stadium, named after the winningest coach in NFL history, who had studied at John Carroll between 1947 and 1951. Shula contributed to the stadium's construction, as did former Washington Redskins star and JCU alumnus London Fletcher '98.

In 1974–75, the wrestling team won the NCAA Division III national championship. In addition, three teams have qualified for the national semifinals in team sporting events: the 2002 football team, the 2003–04 men's basketball team, and the 2016 football team. On November 12, 2016, John Carroll defeated the University of Mount Union 31–28, snapping the program's college football record of 112 straight regular season wins.

There have been 22 individual national champions: 16 in wrestling, two in men's outdoor track & field, one in men's indoor track & field, one in women's outdoor track & field, one in women's diving, and one in men's swimming.

The Men's and Women's Swimming and Diving team has won 6 straight OAC championship titles (2017,2018,2019,2020,2021,2022), the men's tennis team has won four straight OAC titles (2015, 2016, 2017, 2018). The Men's Lacrosse program has won 6 straight OAC championships since joining as a varsity sport in 2013.

The JCU men's basketball team won the OAC regular season and tournament titles in 2018. Since joining the OAC in 1989–90, John Carroll has won twice as many regular season titles (11) in men's basketball than any other school (5) over that span of time.

In club sports, the 2017–18 club rugby team qualified for the national championship.

Notable people

See also

 Association of Jesuit Colleges and Universities
 Ohio Athletic Conference
 WJCU
 The Carroll News
 List of Jesuit sites

References

External links

 
 Official athletics website

 
Universities and colleges in Cuyahoga County, Ohio
Jesuit universities and colleges in the United States
Educational institutions established in 1886
Catholic universities and colleges in Ohio
Roman Catholic Diocese of Cleveland
1886 establishments in Ohio